Kldekari Fortress  a historical fortress in Georgia, Trialeti, on the rocky peak of Trialeti Range near spa town Manglisi, Tetritsqaro Municipality. From here you can see the area around the south, Tsalka and Manglisi, as well as the north - river  Tanis and  Tedzmi Valleys. The ruins are currently preserved. It was located at an important crossroads, where a molten rock formed an exit, name Kldekari means the rock door.

Kldekari Fortress was built after the Argveti feudal lord Liparit I Baghvashi in IX century moved to Trialeti in the 70s. For the next two centuries it was the center of Kldekari Saeristavo. Unable to cope with the growing political power of the Liparitids, the Georgian royal government seized Kldekari Fortress several times.

History 

The eristaves of Kldekar then become so strong that they even oppose the kings. The fighter for the unification of Georgia  Bagrat III, who was patronized by David III Kuropalates, did not obey the eristavi of Kldekar Rati I.  Bagrat did not want to go against a strong father. When David allowed Bagrat to act as he preferred, he launched an army but fighting Rati I in the Kldekari Fortress was not an easy task. The king chose to act by direct means of coming. He first moved from Trialeti to western Georgia, and when winter came, he suddenly stood on top of Rati with his whole army. Rati was not ready to meet, so he chose to surrender without a fight. He came out of the prison, took his son Liparit with him, and begged the king. The king captured the castle, while Rati went to Argveti, which was also his estate.

The battle between the king and the eristaves of Kldekar intensified especially in the late 1020s. He, with a transitional advantage, lasted for several decades.

The owner of Kldekar Fortress,  Eristavi Liparit Baghvashi IV was follower of Bagrat IV of Georgia until they ended up in feud ultimately decided in Battle of Sasireti.  When in 1028 the Byzantine emperor Constantine VIII, in order to conquer Georgia, sent Commander Parakimanos to Georgia with large army  threatening the fortress of Kldekar, Liparit IV of Kldekari fiercely resisted the enemy  and forced Parakimanos to retreat.

In the following years, a rift broke out between Liparit IV of Kldekari and Bagrat IV of Georgia. In the late 1050s, after decisive victory in Battle of Sasireti  Liparit IV became the ruler of almost all of Eastern Georgia and supervised the upbringing of the prince, and crowned the minor George II of Georgia in Ruisi cathedral as King of Georgia.

The domination of Liparit was disliked by other nobles. They intended to get rid of him. Sula Kalmakheli with the help of others captured Liparit and succeeded his son Ivan and the king. The overjoyed king greatly rewarded the rebellious slave invaders. Sula Lipari took away such strong forts as he was. Artanuji, Uplistsikhe, Birtvisi and Kvelistsikhe, but even the king's army could not take Kldekar. Only after the king promised the peasants that he would release Liparit and his son Ivan safely would the castle surrender. The king imprisoned his army, forced Liparit to become a monk, and left Ivan ruler of  Argveti.

In the following years Ivan recaptured Kldekar Castle. But it does not apparent under what conditions this return took place. In the 70s of the same century, the newly enthroned George II of Georgia was overthrown by noble officials, including Ivan Liparit's son Ts. The king subdued the rebels, but rewarded them instead of punishing them; In particular, he asked Ivan Samshvilde. Ivan could not be treated well and after that he ousted the king several times again.

David the Builder reigned in the late 80's. According to his historian, "outside the prisons" the man was nowhere to be found and the buildings were destroyed. Many princes did not obey the king. Only Kldekar and its surrounding area, which occupied Liparit, were loyal to David this time. But this allegiance did not last long: 1094 In the year David captured Liparit and expelled him from Greece after two years in prison. Kldekari Saeristavo even canceled. Clearly, even the castle of Kldekar once lost its old strength. According to the same historian, at the beginning of the XII century Trialeti and Kldekari were occupied by the daughter of Chkondideli, someone named Tevdore.

A very unpleasant fact was witnessed in the castle of Kldekar 1177: as it is known, George III rebelled against his nephew Demna of Georgia, who was supported by many nobles. The main stronghold among them was the Orbelians. If in the early days Libra leaned on the side of the conspirators, soon the situation changed - the king defeated them. The rebels were severely punished, and Demna herself was shot in the rock.

In the following centuries, the Kldekari eristavi played a lesser role in the political life of Georgia, which is why their name is rarely found in the pages of chronicles. So, for example, when David Ulu, who returned to Georgia in the middle of the 13th century, learned that Torghva Pankeli had left him as the ruler of Kakheti, he called him several times. The frightened Torghva did not appear before the king. Then he swore an oath to Khornabujel and brought him. Tabakhmela, the torghva brought to the king's house, was betrayed by the guest Jikur, caught, sent to a cliff, and thrown from a rock there.

In the late feudal era, the Kldekar Saeristavo no longer existed. That is why Kldekar itself is seldom if ever mentioned in historical sources.

See also 
Duchy of Kldekari
Liparitids
Liparit IV of Kldekari
Demna of Georgia
Kldekari (mountain)

References 

Castles and forts in Georgia (country)
Tourist attractions in Kvemo Kartli